Sae Rojanadis (complete title Chao Chom Manda Sae  ) was the Royal Highness Consort of King Chulalongkorn and daughter of Phraya Abbhantrikamat (Dis Rojanadis) and Bang Rojanadis.

She moved to the Grand Palace to be a royal consort of King Chulalongkorn. 

She had 3 children with King Chulalongkorn, Prince Khajera Chirapradidha, Princess Abbhantripaja and Princess Dibyalangkarn.

Reference 

1868 births
1925 deaths
Sae Rojanadis
Sae Rojanadis
Sae Rojanadis
19th-century Chakri dynasty
20th-century Chakri dynasty